Crown Prince Gustav of Sweden may refer to:

 Gustavus, Crown Prince of Sweden (1799–1877), eldest son of the deposed Gustav IV Adolf
 Gustav II Adolf (1594–1632), became king in 1611, also known as Gustav Adolf the Great or Gustavus the Great
 Gustav III of Sweden (1746–1792), became king in 1771
 Gustav IV Adolf of Sweden (1778–1837), king (1792–1809)
 Gustaf V of Sweden (1858–1950), became king in 1907
 Gustaf VI Adolf of Sweden (1882–1973), became king in 1950

See also
 Prince Gustaf Adolf, Duke of Västerbotten (1906–1947), eldest son of Gustav VI Adolf, but died before his father became king